The Donald C. Backer Precision Array for Probing the Epoch of Reionization (PAPER) is a radio interferometer funded by the National Science Foundation  to detect 21 cm hydrogen (HI) fluctuations occurring when the first galaxies ionized intergalactic gas at around 500 Million years after the Big Bang.  
PAPER is a focused experiment aimed toward making the first
statistical detection of the 21 cm reionization
signal.  Given the stringent dynamic range requirements for detecting
reionization in the face of foregrounds that are five orders of
magnitude brighter, the PAPER
project is taking a carefully staged engineering approach, optimizing
each component in the array to mitigate, at the outset, any
potentially debilitating problems in subsequent data calibration and
analysis. This staged approach addresses the
observational challenges that arise from
very-wide-field, high-dynamic-range imaging over wide bandwidths
in the presence of transient terrestrial interference.
PAPER began as a collaboration between Don Backer of the UC Berkeley Radio Astronomy Laboratory and Richard Bradley of the National Radio Astronomy Observatory.  With Backer's passing in 2010, Aaron Parsons has assumed leadership of PAPER on the side of UC Berkeley.

The two fundamental concerns that most influence the design of any HI
reionization detection instrument are removing foregrounds and
achieving the requisite sensitivity. The PAPER approach heavily
emphasizes the former; the level of instrumental calibration and
foreground characterization that will be required to model and remove
polarized galactic synchrotron emission, continuum point-sources, and
galactic/extra-galactic free-free emission is unprecedented in the
100-200 MHz band expected to encompass reionization.

PAPER consists of two distinct arrays: one located at the NRAO site in Green Bank, WV, which
is used primarily for engineering investigations and field testing, and another located at the
South African SKA site in the Karoo desert of the Northern Cape, South Africa., which is used for science observations.

PAPER in Green Bank, West Virginia, USA

PAPER in Green Bank has evolved over a few years from exploring basic
systematics in a rudimentary four-element array to the
more comprehensive system performance testing with the thirty-two element array that is currently deployed
there.  PAPER activities at the NRAO site near Green Bank, WV began in
2005 with the deployment of a 4-antenna, single-polarization interferometer.
After substantial testing and improvement of the PAPER design, we
deployed eight antennas in a nearby field in April, 2008.  This new
system incorporated antenna elements with ground-screen flaps and a digital
correlator based on CASPER hardware.

PAPER in South Africa

The South African array is aimed toward realizing our primary science objective: detecting reionization.  The
instrument is located at the P2 site on the Square Kilometer Array
South Africa (SKA-SA) reserve near the small town of Carnarvon.
Deployments at the SKA-South Africa site in the Karoo desert began
with ground breaking and the deployment of 16 antennas in October
2009, continued with an increase to 32 antennas in April 2010,
followed by commissioning and observing in May 2010.  The array was expanded again in July 2011
to 64 elements. An expansion to 128 antennas is planned for 2013.

PAPER in the HERA roadmap

PAPER, along with the Murchison Widefield Array, are frontier projects within the Hydrogen Epoch
of Reionization Array (HERA) program.  The HERA road map for
exploring reionization was organized into three sequential
phases.  Phase I has as its goal the first statistical detection of
the HI 21 cm signal from reionization.  HERA II entails applying
lessons learned during Phase I to define and build a larger array
capable of detailed characterization of the statistical signal and
imaging the brightest reionization structures.  The final stage
of HERA, Phase III, will address the challenges of full tomographic
imaging using an SKA-scale facility with capabilities informed by the
earlier work.  The HERA program was the highest ranked of the Decadal Survey RMS Panel
scientific recommendations.

Project partners

 University of California, Berkeley
 The National Radio Astronomy Observatory
 University of Pennsylvania
 The Square Kilometre Array (SKA South Africa)

References

Interferometric telescopes
Radio telescopes